Planodema femorata is a species of beetle in the family Cerambycidae. It was described by Charles Joseph Gahan in 1890. It is known from Tanzania and Kenya.

References

Theocridini
Beetles described in 1890